Soracá is a town and municipality in the Colombian Department of Boyacá, part of the subregion of the Central Boyacá Province. Soracá borders the municipalities of Chivatá in the north,
Siachoque, Viracacha and Ramiriquí in the east, Boyacá in the south and the department capital Tunja in the west.

Etymology 
In Chibcha, Soracá means "ruling mansion of the sovereign".

History 
The area of Soracá was part of the zacazgo of Hunza, presently known as Tunja in the time before the Spanish conquest of the Muisca. The Muisca inhabiting the Altiplano Cundiboyacense and their confederation were an advanced civilization who spoke Chibcha. In the 1530s the Spanish conquistadores led by Gonzalo Jiménez de Quesada entered the territories of the Muisca.

Economy 
Main economical activities in Soracá are dairy production, mining and production of bricks.

Born in Soracá 
 Graciano Fonseca, professional cyclist

Gallery

References 

Municipalities of Boyacá Department
Populated places established in 1776
1776 establishments in the Spanish Empire
Muisca Confederation
Muysccubun